Alejandro Morales is an Emeritus Professor of Chicano and Latino Studies at the University of California, Irvine, and an award-winning Mexican-American writer of fiction and poetry. He has published seven ground-breaking novels, three novellas, and one collection of poetry.

Morales received the 2007 Luis Leal Award for Distinction in Chicano/Latino Literature. The Award organizer said of Morales, "he is a true pioneer in Chicano literature and one of the most outstanding, powerful, and innovative writers on the Chicano experience."

Works
 Caras viejas y vino nuevo (1975) J. Mortiz, Mexico  published in English (1981) as Old Faces and New Wine, Maize Press, San Diego 
 La Verdad sin voz (1979), published in English (1988) as Death of an Anglo.
 Reto en el paraíso (1983), a mix of Spanish and English.
 The Brick People (1988) Arte Público Press, Houston, Texas 
 The Rag Doll Plagues (1992)
 Barrio on the Edge (1997)
 Waiting to Happen (2001) - the first volume of the Heteropia Trilogy
 Pequeña Nación (2005) - three short novels
 The Captain of All These Men of Death (2008) Bilingual Press, Tempe, AZ 
 Little Nation and Other Stories (2014).  Trans. Adam Spires.  Houston: Arte Público Press.
 River of Angels (2014).  Houston: Arte Público Press.

References

Further reading
 Franco, Dean.  "Working through the Archive: Trauma and History in Alejandro Morales's The Rag Doll Plagues." PMLA 120.2 (2005): 375-87.
 García-Martínez, Marc.  Francisco A. Lomelí. A Critical Collection on Alejandro Morales: Forging an Alternative Chicano Fiction. Albuquerque, NM: University of New Mexico Press, 2021.
 García-Martínez, Marc.  The Flesh and Blood Aesthetics of Alejandro Morales: Disease, Sex, and Figuration. San Diego: San Diego State University Press, 2014.
 Gurpegui, José Antonio (ed.).  Alejandro Morales: Fiction Past, Present, Future Perfect.  Tempe, AZ: Bilingual Review Press, 1996.
 López López, Margarita.  "Heterotopia and the Emergence of the Modern ilusa in Waiting to Happen by Alejandro Morales. A Critical Collection on Alejandro Morales: Forging an Alternative Chicano Fiction. Eds. M. García-Martínez & F. Lomelí. Albuquerque, NM: University of New Mexico Press, 2021. 39-74.
 López Lozano, Miguel.  "The Politics of Blood: Miscegenation and Phobias of Contagion in Alejandro Morales's The Rag Doll Plagues." Aztlán 28 (2003): 39-74.
 Priewe, Marc.  "Bio-Politics and the ContamiNation of the Body in Alejandro Morales' The Rag Doll Plagues."  MELUS 29.3-4 (2004): 397-412.
 Rosales, Jesús.  La narrativa de Alejandro Morales: Encuentro, historia y compromiso social.  New York: Peter Lang, 1999.
 Schedler, Christopher. "Bugs in the Capitalist Machine: The Schizo-Violence of Alejandro Morales's The Brick People." MELUS 32.1 (2007): 53-74.
 Spires, Adam.  "Brave New Aztlán: Toward a Chicano Dystopia in the Novels of Alejandro Morales."  Revista Canadiense de Estudios Hispánicos 29.2 (2005): 363-78.
 Villalobos, José Pablo.  "Border Real, Border Metaphor: Altering Boundaries in Miguel Méndez and Alejandro Morales." Arizona Journal of Hispanic Cultural Studies 4 (2000): 131-40.

University of California, Irvine faculty
20th-century American novelists
21st-century American novelists
American male novelists
Living people
Chicano literature
20th-century American male writers
21st-century American male writers
Year of birth missing (living people)